Cooktown is an unincorporated community in Fairfax County, Virginia, United States. It is located off Dranesville Road along Folly Lick Branch stream. Cooktown is named for the Cook family who settled in the area after the American Civil War.

References

Unincorporated communities in Fairfax County, Virginia